Podcasting has been embraced in Ireland, both in terms of Irish audiences consuming podcasts but also in Irish people creating their own shows.  The following is a list of podcasts (as opposed to Radio programmes made for radio and released as podcasts) which are produced either in Ireland or by Irish people internationally.

References 

Irish

Ireland-related lists